Line 2 is a line on the Metrorrey system. It has 13 stations and it runs  from Sendero to Zaragoza. The line opened on 30 November 1994.

History
Construction for Line 2 started in February 1993 and was inaugurated on November 30, 1994, in the stretch from General Anaya to Zaragoza. After 14 years, the second stage of the line, from Regina to Universidad, was inaugurated on October 31, 2007, by José Natividad González Parás, Governor of Nuevo León from 2003 to 2009. The last section of Line 2 was inaugurated one year later, on October 1, 2008, form Anáhuac to Sendero, the current northern terminus of the line.

Chronology
November 30, 1994: from General Anaya to Zaragoza
October 31, 2007: from Regina to Universidad
October 1, 2008: from Anáhuac to Sendero

Station list

References

 
Underground rapid transit in Mexico
Electric railways in Mexico
Railway lines opened in 1994
1994 establishments in Mexico